The Muffin Man is a nursery rhyme.

The Muffin Man may also refer to:

 "Muffin Man" (song), by Frank Zappa
 Muffin Men, a British band 
 "Muffin' Man", TV series episode, see list of The Sarah Silverman Program episodes
 The Muffin Man, a minor character in the Shrek franchise